The McLaren Flat Football Club was an Australian rules football originally formed as the Hillside Football Club in 1903 playing in the Southern Football Association.  The Hillside club was named after "Hilside", a farm owned by Mr Fred Wilson of McLaren Vale, one President of the Southern Football Association.

Hillside was renamed McLaren Flat in 1946 and remained in the Southern Football League until the end of the 1997 season, when they merged with the McLaren Vale Football Club and McLaren Districts Junior Football Club to form the McLaren Football Club.

A-Grade Premierships 
 Southern Football Association A-Grade (6)
 1933, 1935, 1937 undefeated, 1939 undefeated, 1946, 1947
 Southern Football League Division 1 (2)
 1966, 1976
 Southern Football League Division 2 (3)
 1983, 1988, 1989

Significant Players 
Sturt champions Paul Bagshaw and Tony Burgan were both recruited from McLaren Flat.

References 

Australian rules football clubs in South Australia
1903 establishments in Australia
Australian rules football clubs established in 1903
1997 disestablishments in Australia
Australian rules football clubs disestablished in 1997